A fire class is a system of categorizing fire with regard to the type of material and fuel for combustion. Class letters are often assigned to the different types of fire, but these differ between territories; there are separate standards for the United States, Europe, and Australia. The fire class is used to determine the types of extinguishing agents that can be used for that category.

Class A: Ordinary combustibles 

Class A fires consist of ordinary combustibles such as wood, paper, fabric, and most kinds of trash. They may be extinguished by water, wet chemical suppression, or dry chemical powder.

Class B: Flammable liquid 

Class B fires are those where the fuel is flammable or combustible liquid. The US system includes flammable gases in their "Class B". These fires follow the same basic fire tetrahedron (heat, fuel, oxygen, chemical reaction) as ordinary combustible fires, except that the fuel in question is a flammable liquid such as gasoline, or gas such as natural gas. A solid stream of water should never be used to extinguish this type because it can cause the fuel to scatter, spreading the flames. 

The most effective way to extinguish a liquid fire is by inhibiting the chemical chain reaction of the fire, which can be done by dry chemical or Halon extinguishing agents. Smothering with CO2 or, for liquids, foam is also effective. Halon has fallen out of favor in recent times (except for aircraft fire extinguishing systems) because it is an ozone-depleting material; the Montreal Protocol declares that Halon should no longer be used. Chemicals such as FM-200 are now the recommended halogenated suppressant.

Class B (US) / Class C (EU/AU): Flammable gases 

Fires where the fuel is flammable or combustible gas are classified as "Class C" in the European/Australian system, and "Class B" along with flammable liquids in the US system. Due to the gaseous nature of the fuel, these fires are difficult to extinguish. The most effective techniques for the control of a flammable gas fire are to stop the flow of fuel (by turning off any gas taps or valves) or to displace the oxygen. Control of fires involving flammable gases where the gas source cannot be controlled must be carefully managed. If the flames are extinguished, but the gas continues to leak, an explosive atmosphere may be created, and the gas may find a source for reignition outside of the originally affected area. Strategies employed to manage these fires may include trying to direct or contain the fire to prevent the ignition of other fuels whilst work is done to control the fuel supply.

Class D: Metal 

Class D fires involve combustible metals - especially alkali metals like lithium and potassium, alkaline earth metals such as magnesium, and group 4 elements such as titanium and zirconium.

Metal fires represent a unique hazard because people are often not aware of the characteristics of these fires and are not properly prepared to fight them. It is also not always clear what type of metal is burning. Therefore, even a small metal fire can spread and become a larger fire in the surrounding ordinary combustible materials. Certain metals catch fire in contact with air or water (for example, sodium), which exacerbates this risk. Monolithic masses of combustible metals do not usually represent great fire risks because heat is conducted away from hot spots so efficiently that the heat of combustion cannot be maintained. In consequence, significant heat energy is required to ignite a contiguous mass of combustible metal. Generally, metal fires are a hazard when the metal is in the form of sawdust, machine shavings, or other metal "fines", which combust more rapidly than larger blocks due to their increased surface-area-to-volume ratio. Metal fires can be ignited by the same ignition sources that would start other common fires.

Special care must be taken when extinguishing metal fires. Water and other common firefighting agents can exacerbate metal fires and make them worse. The National Fire Protection Association recommends that metal fires be fought with dry powder extinguishing agents that work by smothering and heat absorption. Different metals require different extinguishing agents and for a particular metal, agents cannot necessarily be substituted for one another. The most common agents are sodium chloride granules and graphite powder. In recent years, powdered copper has also come into use. These dry powder extinguishers should not be confused with those that contain dry chemical agents. The two are not the same, and only dry powder should be used to extinguish a metal fire. Using a dry chemical extinguisher in error, in place of dry powder, can be ineffective or actually increase the intensity of a metal fire.

Class C (US) / Class E (AU) / Unclassified (EU): Electrical 

Fires predominantly involving electricity have different classifications in each of the three systems. They are classified as a "Class E" fire under the Australian system, "Class C" under the American system, and are classified based on the ignited fuel type under the European system (which previously shared the "Class E" classification with the Australian system). Electrical fires are fires involving potentially energized electrical equipment. This sort of fire may be caused by short-circuiting machinery or overloaded electrical cables. These fires can be a severe hazard to firefighters using water or other conductive agents, as electricity may be conducted from the fire, through water, to the firefighter's body, and then earth. Electrical shocks have caused many firefighter deaths.

Electrical fire may be fought in the same way as an ordinary combustible fire, but water, foam, and other conductive agents are not to be used. While the fire is or possibly could be electrically energized, it can be fought with any extinguishing agent rated for electrical fire. Carbon dioxide CO2, NOVEC 1230, FM-200 and dry chemical powder extinguishers and even baking soda are especially suited to extinguishing this sort of fire. PKP should be a last resort solution to extinguishing the fire due to its corrosive tendencies. Once electricity is shut off to the equipment involved, it will generally become an ordinary combustible fire.

Class F (EU/AU) / Class K (US): Cooking oils and fats (kitchen fires) 

Fires involving cooking oils and fats are classified as "Class F" under the European and Australian systems, and "Class K" under the American system. Though such fires are technically a subclass of the flammable liquid/gas class, the special characteristics of these types of fires, namely the higher flash point, are considered important enough to recognize separately. Some special extinguishers designed for this use smother the fire by turning the oil into a foam. A water mist can also be used. As with Class B fires, a solid stream of water should never be used to extinguish this type because it can cause the fuel to scatter, spreading the flames. . Sometimes fire blankets are used to stop a fire in a kitchen or on a stove.

See also 
 Fire extinguisher

References

External links 
 Classification of Portable Fire Extinguishers, Occupational Safety and Health Administration
 Evacuation Plans and Procedures eTool, Occupational Safety and Health Administration
 Information on Fire Extinguishers, The Fire Safety Advice Centre
 Australian Fire Classes, Futura Fire - Australia
 For Fire Extinguishers, Wollongong Extinguisher Service-Australia

Classification systems
Firefighting